Leptochitonidae is a  of polyplacophoran mollusc. While the subfamily Leptochitoninae has both extant and extinct species, all members of Helminthochitoninae are extinct.

References 

 
Chitons